Cocquio-Trevisago is a comune (municipality) in the Province of Varese in the Italian region of Lombardy, located about  northwest of Milan and about  northwest of Varese.

Cocquio-Trevisago borders the following municipalities: Azzio, Besozzo, Cuvio, Gavirate, Gemonio, Orino.

Demographic evolution

References

Cities and towns in Lombardy